Sibbern is a surname. Notable people with the surname include:

 Carl Sibbern (1809–1880), Norwegian politician
 Georg Sibbern (1816–1901), Norwegian Prime Minister
 Valentin Christian Wilhelm Sibbern (1779–1853), Norwegian government minister

Norwegian-language surnames